Tanya Swanepoel is a paralympic athlete from South Africa competing mainly in category F33 shot put and discus events.

Swanepoelcompeted in the shot put and discus throw at both the 2000 Summer Paralympics and the 2004 Summer Paralympics.  It was in the first of these two games that she won her medals, a bronze in the discus and a silver in the shot put.

References

Paralympic athletes of South Africa
Athletes (track and field) at the 2000 Summer Paralympics
Athletes (track and field) at the 2004 Summer Paralympics
Paralympic silver medalists for South Africa
Paralympic bronze medalists for South Africa
Living people
Medalists at the 2000 Summer Paralympics
Year of birth missing (living people)
Place of birth missing (living people)
Paralympic medalists in athletics (track and field)
South African female discus throwers
South African female shot putters
20th-century South African women
21st-century South African women